Novy (masculine), Novaya (feminine), or Novoye (neuter) may refer to:

People
 Frederick George Novy (1864–1957), American pioneer bacteriologist
 Jeremy Novy, American street artist
 Lili Novy (1885–1958), Slovene poet
 Tom Novy (born 1970), German DJ and producer
 Milan Nový (born 1951), Czech former ice hockey player
 Miroslav Nový, Czech former ice hockey player
 Oldřich Nový (1899–1983), Czech actor
 Richard Nový, Czech rower
 Novy, nickname of Marcin Nowak (born 1975), Polish death metal musician

Places
Novy (inhabited locality) (Novaya, Novoye), several inhabited localities in Russia
Novy Port, a port on the mouth of the Ob River, Russia
Khabarovsk Novy Airport, an airport in Khabarovsk, Russia
Novaya (river), a tributary of the Khatanga in Russia

Companies
 Novaya Gazeta, Russian newspaper
 Novy, Dutch homeware store owned by the Audax Groep

See also
Nova (disambiguation)
Nove (disambiguation)
Novi (disambiguation)
Novo (disambiguation)
Novus (disambiguation)
Novaya Zemlya, an archipelago in the Arctic Ocean, northern Russia

Slavic-language surnames
Czech-language surnames